Kanthal is the trademark for a family of iron-chromium-aluminium (FeCrAl) alloys used in a wide range of resistance and high-temperature applications. Kanthal FeCrAl alloys consist of mainly iron, chromium (20–30%) and aluminium (4–7.5 %). The first Kanthal FeCrAl alloy was developed by Hans von Kantzow in Hallstahammar, Sweden. The alloys are known for their ability to withstand high temperatures and having intermediate electric resistance. As such, it is frequently used in heating elements. The trademark Kanthal is owned by Sandvik Intellectual Property AB.

Characteristics
For heating, resistance wire must be stable in air when hot.  Kanthal FeCrAl alloy forms a protective layer of aluminium oxide (alumina). Aluminium oxide has high thermal conductivity but is an electrical insulator, so special techniques may be required to make good electrical connections.

Depending on specific composition the resistivity is about 1.4μΩ·m and temperature coefficient is +49ppm/K.

Uses 
Kanthal is used in heating elements due to its flexibility, durability and tensile strength. Its uses are widespread, for example in toasters, home and industrial heaters, kilns and diffusion heaters (used in the making of crystalline silicon).

Kanthal is used for heating coils in electronic cigarettes. Unlike alternative types of metal such as Nichrome, Kanthal is durable enough to withstand the temperatures needed, but flexible and cheap enough to be practical.

See also 
 Nichrome

References

External links
 The brand website for Kanthal products
 Resistance wire technical information tables

Chromium alloys
Ferrous alloys
Refractory metals
Swedish inventions

de:Heizleiterlegierung#Kanthal